Carla Woodcock (born 4 October 1998) is an English actress. Woodcock made her acting debut as Susie Garrett on the Netflix series Free Rein, a role she played from 2017 to 2019. She was then cast as Marina Perry on the fourth series of the Channel 4 series Ackley Bridge in 2021, as well as starring in the ITVX teen drama series Tell Me Everything.

Early life
Woodcock was born on 4 October 1998 in Wheldrake, York. While she was young, she began taking lessons in horseriding, but stopped when she began studying acting. At the age of eleven, she began studying at Stagecoach Theatre Arts in York. When she was thirteen, she began attending the London Academy of Music and Dramatic Art (LAMDA). While at LAMDA, Woodcock was noted for her "star quality" and it has been stated that she achieved distinctions in each LAMDA grade. She then went on to study Acting at York College in 2015

Career
In 2016, Woodcock was cast in the Netflix drama series Free Rein as Susie Garrett. The series made its debut in 2017, and she portrayed Susie in all three series, as well as the two feature-length specials. At the beginning of the series, Woodcock describes her character Susie as "a bit of pushover who lives in the shadow of her best friend", but notes that by the conclusion of Free Rein, Susie is a "strong, confident young woman". After the first series of Free Rein, Woodcock appeared in two episodes of the ITV soap opera Emmerdale as Lilly.

In 2019, Woodcock appeared in two episodes of the CW science fiction series Pandora as Sarika Larson, alongside Free Rein co-star Martin Bobb-Semple. On appearing in Pandora, Woodcock stated that she does not "have much experience with the Sci-Fi genre", noting that "it was fun and interesting to be submerged in another world for a couple of weeks".

In August 2020, it was announced that Woodcock had joined the cast of the Channel 4 school drama series Ackley Bridge as "mean girl" Marina Perry. In November 2021, she appeared in the Sky Cinema film The Colour Room. In 2022, Woodcock had roles in the ITV2 teen drama series Tell Me Everything as Zia and the Lifetime prequel miniseries Flowers in the Attic: The Origin. She was also cast alongside Callum Kerr in the pilot of a Hulu adaptation of Richard Mason's History of a Pleasure Seeker, but it was not picked up for series.

Filmography

References

External links
 

1998 births
21st-century English actresses
Actresses from York
English child actresses
English film actresses
English television actresses
Living people